Paul Zeitz (born July 5, 1958) is a Professor of Mathematics at the University of San Francisco. He is the author of The Art and Craft of Problem Solving, and a co-author of Statistical Explorations with Excel.

Biography 

In 1974 Paul Zeitz won the USA Mathematical Olympiad (USAMO) and was a member of the first American team to participate in the International Mathematical Olympiad (IMO). The following year he graduated from Stuyvesant High School.

He earned a Westinghouse scholarship and graduated from Harvard University in 1981.

Since 1985, he has composed and edited problems for several national math contests, including the USAMO. He has helped train several American IMO teams, most notably the 1994 "Dream Team", the first team from any country to score a perfect 252 in the Olympiad. (The only other team to have ever done so was China's 2022 team.)

Zeitz founded the Bay Area Math Meet in 1994 and co-founded the Bay Area Mathematical Olympiad in 1999. In 1999 he wrote The Art and Craft of Problem Solving , a popular book on problem solving.

In 2003 Zeitz received from the Mathematical Association of America the Deborah and Franklin Haimo Awards for Distinguished College or University Teaching of Mathematics.

References

Stuyvesant High School alumni
1958 births
Living people
Harvard University alumni
University of San Francisco faculty
20th-century American mathematicians
21st-century American mathematicians
International Mathematical Olympiad participants
Mathematicians from New York (state)